Odinia boletina is a species of fly in the family Odiniidae. It is found in the  Palearctic .

References

External links
Images representing Odinia at BOLD

Odiniidae
Insects described in 1848
Muscomorph flies of Europe